Enqvist is a Swedish surname, present mainly in Sweden and in Finland. Alternate spellings include Enquist and Enkvist.

Notable people
Notable people who have this surname include:
 Björn Morgan Enqvist, Swedish footballer
 Kari Enqvist, Finnish cosmologist
 Oskar Enqvist, Russian admiral
 Simon Enqvist, Finnish football player
 Thomas Enqvist, Swedish tennis player

See also
 Enquist

References